David Breonard Powers Jr. (June 14, 1874 – January 29, 1936) was an American attorney and politician. He served five terms in the Virginia House of Delegates between 1901 and 1916, representing Caroline County, and was appointed Caroline's Commonwealth's attorney in 1926. In 1933, he briefly returned to the House after winning a special election to succeed the deceased George P. Lyon. At the time of his death, he was the largest landowner in the county.

References

External links 

1874 births
1936 deaths
Members of the Virginia House of Delegates
20th-century American politicians